Anton Foliforov (born 3 January 1981) is a Russian mountain bike orienteer. He won an  individual gold medal at the 2010 World MTB Orienteering Championships, and won gold medals with the Russian relay team in 2009 and 2010.

References

Russian orienteers
Male orienteers
Russian male cyclists
Mountain bike orienteers
Living people
1981 births
Place of birth missing (living people)
21st-century Russian people